Khripunovsky is a rural locality (a village) in Kuganaksky Selsoviet, Sterlitamaksky District, Bashkortostan, Russia. The population was 10 as of 2010. There is 1 street.

Geography 
Khripunovsky is located 31 km northeast of Sterlitamak (the district's administrative centre) by road. Bolshoy Kuganak is the nearest rural locality.

References 

Rural localities in Sterlitamaksky District